Domikan is a rural locality (a selo) in Arkharinsky District, Amur Oblast, Russia. Population: 176 as of 2018.

Geography 
Domikan is located on the left bank of the Domikan River, 56 km north of Arkhara (the district's administrative centre) by road. Gulikovka is the nearest rural locality.

References

Rural localities in Arkharinsky District